Millerton is an unincorporated community in Butler County, Nebraska, United States.

History
A post office called Millerton was established in 1888, and remained in operation until it was discontinued in 1934. The community was named for William P. Miller, a pioneer settler.

References

Unincorporated communities in Butler County, Nebraska
Unincorporated communities in Nebraska